Antonio Grajera was a soldier and early Californian pioneer.

Grajera became a Spanish frontier soldier around 1778. Later, following his promotion to Lieutenant in the Espana dragoon regiment, he traveled to San Diego to take up his appointment as Commandantof the Presidio of San Diego on October 19, 1783. He never saw active service, but was "capable in his duties".

Grajera had no family and his illicit relationships with the women of the presidio, and excessive use of alcohol, caused some scandal. He resigned temporarily on August 23, 1799, but never resumed his office.

See also 
 Bancroft, Hubert Howe, The History of California (1884) Vol I. 1542–1800, pp. 646.

Military personnel from California
People from San Diego
Year of birth missing
Year of death missing
People of Alta California